Evan McKee White (born April 26, 1996) is an American professional baseball first baseman for the Seattle Mariners of Major League Baseball (MLB). He played college baseball for the Kentucky Wildcats.

Amateur career
White attended Lincoln High School in Gahanna, Ohio and the University of Kentucky where he played college baseball for the Wildcats.

As a freshman, White started all 52 games and hit .318/.369/.410 with two home runs and 28 runs batted in (RBI). As a sophomore in 2016, White started all 54 games, hitting .376/.419./.535 with five home runs and 40 RBI. After the season, he played for the United States collegiate national team.

Professional career
Considered one of the top prospects for the 2017 Major League Baseball draft, the Seattle Mariners selected White with the 17th overall selection. After signing, he was assigned to the Everett AquaSox where he posted a .277 batting average with three home runs, 12 RBIs and a .877 OPS in 14 games. In 2018, White played with the Modesto Nuts and the Tacoma Rainiers, slashing a combined .300/.371/.453 with 11 home runs and 66 RBIs in 124 games. He spent 2019 with the Arkansas Travelers, batting .293/.350/.488 with 18 home runs and 55 RBIs over 92 games. White was named to the 2019 All-Star Futures Game.

On November 25, 2019, White signed a six-year major league contract (with three club options) with the Mariners.

On July 24, 2020, White was the starting first baseman, making his MLB debut on Opening Day. He finished the season with a .176 batting average, the lowest among all qualifying hitters in the shortened 60-game season, and a .252 on base percentage, also the lowest, along with eight home runs and 26 RBIs in 54 games. He won his first Gold Glove Award in 2020, manning first base.

On June 22, 2021, White was placed on the 60-day injured list with a left hip flexor strain and was sent for a second opinion on the injury. On July 16, White elected to undergo season-ending hip surgery.

On March 26, 2022, it was announced that White would undergo surgery to repair a sports hernia. On April 28, White was transferred to the 60-day injured list as he continued to recover.

White was optioned to Triple-A Tacoma to begin the 2023 season.

Personal
White and his wife, Kari, married in December 2019.

References

External links

Kentucky Wildcats bio

1996 births
Living people
Arkansas Travelers players
Baseball players from Columbus, Ohio
Everett AquaSox players
Gold Glove Award winners
Kentucky Wildcats baseball players
Major League Baseball first basemen
Modesto Nuts players
Peoria Javelinas players
Seattle Mariners players
Tacoma Rainiers players